Freedom of religion in Ecuador is guaranteed by the country's constitution, and the government generally respects this right in practice. Government policy contributes to the generally free practice of religion.

Religious demography

The country has an area of 283,561 square kilometres and a population of 15 million (in 2010). The Catholic Episcopal Conference estimates that 85 percent of the population is Roman Catholic, with 35 percent of Catholics actively practicing. Some groups, particularly indigenous people who live in the mountains, follow a syncretic form of Catholicism that combines indigenous beliefs with orthodox Catholic doctrine. The Evangelical Missionary Union estimates that there are one million Protestants.

Many of the religious groups registered with the Government have very small numbers; these include Anglicans, Baha'is, Episcopalians, Lutherans, Presbyterians, and the Unification Church. Other groups present in small numbers are Muslims, Jews, and adherents of Eastern Orthodox religions. There are also followers of Inti, the traditional Inca sun god, and some atheists, but there were no reliable statistics on the size of these smaller groups.

Status of religious freedom

The Constitution provides for freedom of religion, and the Government generally respects this right in practice. The Government at all levels has sought to protect this right in full and does not tolerate its abuse, either by governmental or private actors. The Constitution grants all citizens and foreigners the right to practice publicly and freely the religion of their choice. The only limits imposed by the Government are "those proscribed by law to protect and respect the diversity, plurality, security, and rights of others." The Constitution prohibits discrimination based on religion.

The Government requires religious groups to be licensed or registered if they engage in proselytizing activity. Religious organizations that do not engage in such activity may still choose to register to obtain a legal identity, which is desirable when entering into contracts. Any religious organization wishing to register with the Government must possess a charter, have nonprofit status, include all names used by the group (to ensure that names of previously registered groups are not used without their permission), and provide signatures of at least 15 members. In addition, groups must file a petition with the Ministry of Government, using a licensed attorney, and pay a $100 registration fee. During the period covered by this report, the Government continued to streamline the registration process for religious groups.

The Government permits missionary activity and public religious expression by all religious groups.

The Government does not generally permit religious instruction in public schools. Private schools have complete liberty to provide religious instruction, as do parents in the home.

Government policy and practice contribute to the generally free practice of religion. Catholics reportedly complained that the Government restricted access for ecological reasons to the Galápagos Islands to the extent that foreign missionaries had difficulty ministering to the 14,500 resident Catholics. There were no reports of religious prisoners or detainees in the country.

On August 27, 2006, two military officers (Ivan Santi Mucushigua and Cervantes Santamaria Cuji) and a civilian (Lucio Cirilo Dahua) allegedly killed Balti Cadena, a traditional healer (yachak), and injured one of his sons, near the Amazonas Military Fort in Puyo, Pastaza Province. The Public Prosecutor, in a civilian court, charged the two military officers with murder. At the end of the reporting period, the officers were held at the Amazonas Military Fort and had appealed to the Superior Court of Puyo. Press reports added that at least four traditional healers have been killed in the past 10 years in the same area.

There were no reports of forced religious conversion.

Societal abuses and discrimination

There were no reports of societal abuses or discrimination based on religious belief or practice. Many religious groups increased their outreach efforts to their counterparts during the period covered by this report.

References

Ecuador
Religion in Ecuador